Summer Melody may refer to:

Summer Melody, album by the Dutch band George Baker Selection 1977
"Summer Melody", jazz instrumental from Shaft (Bernard Purdie album) 1971
"Summer Melody", Japanese-language song by Yukari Tamura 2001

See also
"Die Sommermelodie" ("The Summer Melody") West-German entry in the Eurovision Song Contest 1974